In software engineering, the active record pattern is an architectural pattern. It is found in software that stores in-memory object data in relational databases. It was named by Martin Fowler in his 2003 book Patterns of Enterprise Application Architecture. The interface of an object conforming to this pattern would include functions such as Insert, Update, and Delete, plus properties that correspond more or less directly to the columns in the underlying database table.

The active record pattern is an approach to accessing data in a database. A database table or view is wrapped into a class. Thus, an object instance is tied to a single row in the table. After creation of an object, a new row is added to the table upon save. Any object loaded gets its information from the database. When an object is updated, the corresponding row in the table is also updated. The wrapper class implements accessor methods or properties for each column in the table or view.

This pattern is commonly used by object persistence tools and in object–relational mapping (ORM). Typically, foreign key relationships will be exposed as an object instance of the appropriate type via a property.

Implementations 
Implementations of the concept can be found in various frameworks for many programming environments. For example, if there is a table parts in a database with columns name (string type) and price (number type), and the Active Record pattern is implemented in the class Part, the pseudo-code

will create a new row in the parts table with the given values, and is roughly equivalent to the SQL command

INSERT INTO parts (name, price) VALUES ('Sample part', 123.45);

Conversely, the class can be used to query the database:

This will find a new Part object based on the first matching row from the parts table whose name column has the value "gearbox". The SQL command used might be similar to the following, depending on the SQL implementation details of the database:

SELECT * FROM parts WHERE name = 'gearbox' LIMIT 1; -- MySQL or PostgreSQL

Criticism

Testability 
Due to the coupling of database interaction and application logic when using the active record pattern, unit testing an active record object without a database becomes difficult. These negative effects on testability of the active record pattern can be reduced by using mocking or dependency injection frameworks to substitute the real data tier with a simulated one.

Single responsibility principle and separation of concerns 
Another critique of the active record pattern is that, also due to the strong coupling of database interaction and application logic, an active record object does not follow the 
single responsibility principle and separation of concerns as opposed to multitier architecture which properly addresses these practices. Because of this, the active record pattern is best and most often employed in simple applications that are all forms-over-data with CRUD functionality, or only as one part of an architecture. Typically that part is data access and why several ORMs implement the active record pattern.

Distributed systems 
Record-based patterns work poorly in distributed systems especially where concurrency is impossible (e.g. offline). i.e. two updates both may have one field that is correct but only one of the two records can win.

See also

References 

Architectural pattern (computer science)
Software design patterns